At the 2000 Commonwealth Youth Games, the athletics events were held at the Meadowbank Stadium in Edinburgh, Scotland from 11–13 August. A total of 30 events were contested, divided equally between the sexes. Among the medallists were Nicola Sanders, the 2007 World Championships runner-up in the 400 metres, and Johan Cronje (bronze medallist at the 2013 World Championships in Athletics in the 1500 metres).

Medal summary

Boys

Girls

References

Results
2000 Commonwealth Youth Games. World Junior Athletics History. Retrieved on 2013-10-20.
Commonwealth Youth Games. GBR Athletics. Retrieved on 2013-10-20.

2000
Commonwealth Youth Games
2000 Commonwealth Youth Games
2000 in youth sport